Podgorje pri Letušu is a settlement in the Municipality of Braslovče in northern Slovenia. It lies on the right bank of the Savinja River west of Letuš under the Dobrovlje Hills. The area is part of the traditional region of Styria. The municipality is now included in the Savinja Statistical Region.

Name
The name of the settlement was changed from Podgorje to Podgorje pri Letušu in 1953.

References

External links
Podgorje pri Letušu on Geopedia

Populated places in the Municipality of Braslovče